is a retired Japanese wrestler and politician of the Liberal Democratic Party, a member of the House of Councillors in the Diet (national legislature). A native of Yokohama, Kanagawa, she ran unsuccessfully for House of Councillors in 2004 but was allowed to join the house in 2006 when Heizo Takenaka, a member of the house, resigned.

As a professional wrestler she worked for several women's promotions from the 1980s to the 2000s, including Japan Women's Pro-Wrestling and its offshoot, Ladies' Legend Pro-Wrestling (LLPW), of which she became the president in 2002.  She held several championships, including the LLPW Singles Championship in 1993 and 1997, and the WWWA World Single Championship in 1998.

During her career, Kandori also had some hardcore matches. On March 14, 1997, Kandori had a bloody deathmatch, where the ring ropes were replaced with barbed wire, against Megumi Kudo in FMW.

Judo 
Kandori captured the bronze medal at the 1984 World Judo Championships. She later planned to compete at the 1988 Summer Olympics, but halfway to the Olympics she lost motivation for judo competition. Kandori considered becoming a trainer, but she became interested on professional wrestling, and eventually retired from judo in order to pursue a wrestling career.

Professional wrestling career

Japan Women's Pro Wrestling (1986-1987) 
Kandori joined the recently established Japan Women's Pro-Wrestling in 1986. Riding on her background as a judo medalist, she adopted the gimmick of an arrogant martial artist, stating in an interview that she hated professional wrestling and that she could defeat Dump Matsumoto in ten seconds. Before the time of her debut, she trained under Kotetsu Yamamoto and Yoshiaki Fujiwara in the New Japan Pro-Wrestling dojo, where she got to spar with male wrestlers thanks to her athleticism and skill. Kandori ultimately debuted in JWP debut show on August 17, 1986 against Jackie Sato.

With her popularity quickly rising, Kandori came to be considered one of JWP's shitenno along with Sato, Rumi Kazama and Nancy Kumi. Her real life relationship with Sato, however, would sour after Sato gave Kandori a real eye injury during a match. In a match on July 6, 1987, Sato went off script and legitimately attacked Kandori, hitting repeatedly her still healing eye, without being warned or punished by the promotion afterwards. The situation finally exploded in an infamous incident on July 18, 1987, when Kandori attacked Sato in revenge and beat her on the ring for several minutes, inflicting injuries that led to Sato's retirement. Kandori left the company after the incident and tried to join All Japan Women's Pro-Wrestling, having contacted with its main star Chigusa Nagayo, but was unable to do so due to contractual reasons.

Ladies Legend Pro Wrestling (1993–present) 
Kandori made her debut for Ladies Legend Pro-Wrestling on January 15, 1993 by teaming up with Mikiko Futagami and losing to Eagle Sawai and Harley Saito. For the first couple of months, Kandori would mostly compete in tag team matches with Rumi Kazama, Miki Handa and Harley Saito. On August 29, Kandori defeated Harley Saito in the semi final of the LLPW Singles Championship Tournament and went on to defeat Eagle Sawai in the finals to become the LLPW Singles Champion. Kandori defended the championship twice against Eagle Sawai and eventually lost it to Noriyo Tateno on September 23, 1994.

Kandori continued to wrestle for LLPW for the next few years with nothing of any note happening until June 20, 1996, when she teamed up with Karula and Rumi Kazama to lose to Carol Midori, Mikiko Futagami and Yasha Kurenai for the vacant LLPW Tag Team Championship. On November 8, 1997, Kandori defeated Eagle Sawai for her second LLPW Single Championship. On March 21, 1998, Kandori defeated Yumiko Hotta to become the WWWA World Single Champion and held the title for almost a year before losing it back to Hotta on March 10, 1999. Later in the year, Kandori lost the LLPW Single Championship to Harley Saito. In 2002, Kandori became the president of Ladies Legend Pro Wrestling. On January 25, 2004, Kandori and Takako Inoue defeated Amazing Kong and Eagle Sawai to become the LLPW Tag Team Champions and lost the titles on May 30 to Eiger and Sayuri Okino.

Mixed martial arts career

Ladies Legend Pro Wrestling 
As a former judo medalist, Kandori made her debut in the mixed martial arts as part of the Ultimate L-1 Tournament promoted by LLPW in 1995. She first faced kickboxer Liz Africano in the first round and defeated her with ease, taking her down and locking a rear naked choke on her overwhelmed opponent. Kandori then advanced to the second round, where she fought wrestler Fieni Klee. Although Klee sprawled to a takedown attempt and locked a guillotine choke, Shinobu was able to escape and take her back, winning by rear naked choke again. At the finals, Kandori's last opponent would be multiple judo medalist Svetlana Goundarenko, who outweighed Kandori by 100 lbs. Goundarenko pressed Shinobu against the fence to avoid her striking and attempted a hip throw, but Kandori blocked it. After a brief punch combo by Kandori, however, Svetlana finally took Shinobu down and overpowered her, locking a neck crank and making Kandori tap out.

In 1998, Kandori fought a rematch against Goundarenko, again in a LLPW event. Cornered by former sumo champion Koji Kitao, Shinobu showed an improved submission defense, while her opponent fought more cautiously. Goundarenko threw Shinobu with ura nage and tried to smother her from the back, but the pro wrestler escaped. Then, blocking a hip throw and a kata guruma attempt, Kandori took her back and closed a guillotine choke, forcing Goundarenko into submission for the win.

Rizin 
Kandori was expected to face Gabi Garcia on December 31, 2016, at Rizin Fighting Federation's year-end show in Saitama, Japan. However, a rib injury forced her to pull out of the fight. She was replaced by Yumiko Hotta.

Championships and accomplishments 
 All Japan Women's Pro-Wrestling
 WWWA World Single Championship (1 time)
 Japan Women's Pro-Wrestling
 Pacific Coast Tag Team Championship (1 time) - with Rumi Kazama
 UWA World Women's Championship
 Ladies Legend Pro-Wrestling
 LLPW Singles Championship (2 times)
 LLPW Tag Team Championship (1 time) - with Takako Inoue
 Tokyo Sports
 Joshi Puroresu Grand Prize (1995, 1998)

Mixed martial arts record 

|-
|Win
|align=center|4-1
|Yumiko Hotta
|Submission (armbar)
|LLPW - L-1 2000: The Strongest Lady
|
|align=center|1
|align=center|7:50
|Tokyo, Japan
|
|-
|Win
|align=center|3-1
|Svetlana Goundarenko
|Submission (guillotine choke)
|LLPW - Ultimate L-1 Challenge
|
|align=center|1
|align=center|4:08
|Tokyo, Japan
|
|-
|Loss
|align=center|2-1
|Svetlana Goundarenko
|Submission (neck crank)
|LLPW - Ultimate L-1 Tournament
|
|align=center|1
|align=center|5:55
|Tokyo, Japan
|
|-
|Win
|align=center|2-0
|Fieni Klee
|Submission (rear naked choke)
|LLPW - Ultimate L-1 Tournament
|
|align=center|1
|align=center|0:56
|Tokyo, Japan
|
|-
|Win
|align=center|1-0
|Liz Africano
|Submission (rear naked choke)
|LLPW - Ultimate L-1 Tournament
|
|align=center|1
|align=center|0:42
|Tokyo, Japan
|

Notes

References

External links 
 Official website in Japanese.

Female members of the House of Councillors (Japan)
Members of the House of Councillors (Japan)
Japanese female professional wrestlers
Japanese female judoka
Japanese female mixed martial artists
Mixed martial artists utilizing judo
Mixed martial artists utilizing wrestling
Japanese sportsperson-politicians
People from Yokohama
Sportspeople from Yokohama
1964 births
Living people
Liberal Democratic Party (Japan) politicians
Politicians from Kanagawa Prefecture